A king is a male monarch.

King or KING may also refer to:

Places

Australia 
 Electoral district of King (New South Wales) (1904–1920, 1927–1973)
 Electoral district of King (South Australia) (2018–)
 King Land District, Western Australia
 King Sound, Western Australia
 King Valley, Victoria

United States 
 Fort King, a former military fort in Florida
 King Archaeological Site, Georgia
 King, Indiana, an unincorporated community
 King, North Carolina, a town
 King, Portland, Oregon, a neighborhood
 King Hollow, a valley in Tennessee
 King, Clay County, West Virginia
 King, Wetzel County, West Virginia
 King, Lincoln County, Wisconsin, a town
 King, Waupaca County, Wisconsin, a census-designated place

Other places
 King (crater), a lunar crater
 King (TTC), a subway stop in Toronto, Canada
 King, Ontario, Canada, a township
 King, Papua New Guinea, a village

People
 King (surname)
 King (given name), a list of people with the given name or nickname
 King Sunny Adé, stage name of Nigerian musician Sunday Adeniyi Adegeye (born 1946)
 King ov Hell or King (born 1974), Norwegian musician Tom Cato Visnes
 King Von, stage name of African American rapper Dayvon Daquan Bennett (1994–2020)
 Eli Ohana, nicknamed the King (born 1964), Israeli soccer coach and manager

Animals
 King (horse)
 King pigeon
 King, a cluster of animals knotted together by the tail, as in rat king and squirrel king

Arts, entertainment, and media

Fictional entities 
 King (Art of Fighting)
 King (Mega Man)
 King (Tekken)
 King, a character in Chapter 1 of Deltarune
 King, a character in Cave Story
 King, a character in Kamen Rider Blade
 King, a character in The Owl House
 King, a character in Rimba Racer
 Raj King, a television presenter in the British web series Corner Shop Show
 The King (Cars)

Films 
 King (miniseries), 1978 TV show
 King (1998 film), an Indian film by Srikanth Kulkarni
 King (2002 film), an Indian film by Prabu Solomon
 The King (2005 film), a drama by James Marsh
 The King (2007 film), an Australian biopic
 King (2008 film), an Indian film by Sreenu Vaitla
 The King (2019 film), a film by David Michôd
 DOUBLE KING, A 2017 short film by Felix Colgrave

Games 
 King (card game), a card game related to Barbu
 King (chess)
 King (playing card)
 King, a chess engine for the Chessmaster series
 King, a promoted piece in draughts

Music

Groups
 We Are King, an American R&B/soul girl group previously named King
 King 810, an American metal band
 King (pop band), a British pop group
 King (new wave band), a British New Wave band

Albums
 King (Belly album)
 King (Fleshgod Apocalypse album)
 King (Kollegah album)
 King (Nine album)
 King (O.A.R. album)
 King (T.I. album)
 King (Tucker Beathard album)
 The King (album), an album by Teenage Fanclub

Songs
 "King" (UB40 song), 1980
 "King" (Years & Years song), 2015
 "King" (Florence and the Machine song), 2022

 "King", a song by the Reverend Horton Heat from the album Spend a Night in the Box, 2000
 "King", a song by Audio Adrenaline from the album Until My Heart Caves In, 2005
 "King", a song by Weezer from the album Weezer, 2008
 "King", a song by Lauren Aquilina from the EP Fools, 2012
 "King", a song by T.I. from the album Paperwork, 2014
 "King", a song by XXXTentacion from the mixtape Revenge, 2017
 "King", a song by Tesseract from the album Sonder, 2018
 "The King", a song by Raven from the album Nothing Exceeds Like Excess, 1988
 "K.I.N.G.", a 2006 song by Satyricon

Record companies
 King Records (Japan), a Japanese record label
 King Records (USA), an American record label
 King Worldwide, a New Zealand record manufacturing plant

Television
 King (2003 TV series), a Canadian children's show
 King (2011 TV series), a Canadian police drama
 King (miniseries), a 1978 miniseries
 KING-TV, a television station in Seattle, Washington

Other arts, entertainment, and media
 King (magazine), a monthly men's magazine geared toward African American and urban audiences
 King Comics, a short-lived comic book imprint of King Features Syndicate
 KING-FM, a radio station (98.1 FM) licensed to serve Seattle, Washington, United States
 KING-LP, a low-power radio station (95.1 FM) licensed to serve Lusk, Wyoming, United States
 KPTR (AM), a radio station that used the call letters KING from 1948 to 1990

Brands and enterprises 
 King (automobile), an American automobile manufactured up to 1923
 King (company), the creator of the game Candy Crush
 King Musical Instruments, an instrument manufacturer known for producing marching instruments
 King Pharmaceuticals, a pharmaceutical company acquired by Pfizer in 2010
 King Radio (company), avionics manufacturer known today as BendixKing

Ships 
 USS King (DD-242), a United States Navy World War II destroyer
 USS King (DDG-41), a United States Navy guided missile destroyer

Other uses
 King or GWR 6000 Class, a class of steam locomotive
 King, a common fig cultivar
 Hurricane King, which struck Florida in 1950
 King baronets
 King consort, the husband of a female queen regnant 
 King University, a private university in Bristol, Tennessee

See also 
 King County (disambiguation)
 King Creek (disambiguation)
 King Island (disambiguation)
 King Lake (disambiguation)
 King Peak (disambiguation)
 King Range (disambiguation)
 King River (disambiguation)
 King Street (disambiguation)
 King Township (disambiguation)
 Kings (disambiguation)
 The King (disambiguation)
 Justice King (disambiguation)